Contempt is the first album by Assemblage 23. In 1998, the Canadian label Gashed Records signed Assemblage 23 and released Contempt in 1999. Shortly afterwards it was re-released by Metropolis Records International. The album peaked at #8 on the CMJ RPM Charts in the U.S. and ranked #42 on the German Alternative Charts (DAC) Top Albums of 2000.

Track listing
 Anthem – 5:53
 Surface – 5:04
 Coward – 5:49
 Bi-Polar – 5:57
 Pages – 4:45
 Purgatory – 5:48
 Sun – 4:26
 Skyquake – 6:29
 Never Forgive – 4:28
 7 Days – 3:12
 Coward [Melting Mix by Pain Station] – 7:12
 Skyquake [Voice of God Mix by Manhole Vortex, Protocol X] – 6:17
 The Drowning Season [DSKØ2k Mix by Ed Vargo of THD] – 6:06

References

Assemblage 23 albums
1999 debut albums